Abellio ScotRail, operating services under the name ScotRail, was the  national train operating company of Scotland. A subsidiary of Abellio, it operated the ScotRail franchise from 1 April 2015, taking over from predecessor First ScotRail. 

The franchise ended on 31 March 2022 and was replaced by ScotRail, an operator of last resort owned by the Scottish Government.

History
In November 2013, Transport Scotland announced that Abellio, Arriva, FirstGroup, MTR Corporation and National Express had been shortlisted to bid for the new ScotRail franchise. In October 2014, the franchise was awarded to Abellio. The franchise was to operate for seven years with a three-year extension available contingent on performance criteria being met. Abellio began operating the franchise on 1 April 2015 and it opened the Borders Railway on 6 September 2015.

In June 2016, the RMT union announced that train conductors would be going on strike several times during the summer months in protest at more driver only trains. Six 24-hour and three 48-hour strikes were held on ScotRail services during June and July 2016. An agreement was reached in September 2016, bringing an end to the dispute. It was agreed that the new Class 385 trains would have the doors controlled by both the driver and the conductors, the driver opening the doors and the conductors closing them.

On 20 January 2017 the managing director of ScotRail and the ScotRail alliance stepped down from his role after 18 months in the company. Within a few days Alex Hynes was named as the new managing director.

Having failed to meet the performance criteria necessary to gain a three-year extension, the franchise concluded on 31 March 2022 with ScotRail taking over the franchise as an operator of last resort.

Operations

Services
Abellio ScotRail took over all of the services operated by First ScotRail on 1 April 2015, except for the Caledonian Sleeper services, which were transferred to a separate franchise operated by Serco. The franchise agreement required the introduction of 'Great Scottish Scenic Railway' trains on the West Highland, Far North, Kyle, Borders Railway and Glasgow South Western lines. Steam special services were also promoted by Abellio ScotRail.

Due to the delayed delivery of ScotRail's refurbished Inter7City trains, the company was unable to introduce its new Intercity timetable at the same time as the introduction of the Edinburgh - Arbroath and Montrose - Inverurie commuter services. As a result, the stopping pattern of Glasgow/Edinburgh to Aberdeen services is irregular, making calls at many stations at which there is now a frequent stopping service. The improved Glasgow/Edinburgh to Inverness timetable will be introduced along with the Glasgow/Edinburgh to Aberdeen timetable from December 2020.

With the completion of the Inverness - Aberdeen Improvement Plan, an hourly service will operate between the two cities, with half hourly services between Elgin and Inverness/Inverurie and Aberdeen that will serve the two new stations of Dalcross and Kintore. In addition to this, a selection of Inter7City services will operate between Inverness and the Central Belt via Aberdeen, calling at only a couple of stations between Inverness and Aberdeen.

Demise
In December 2019, it was announced by the Scottish government that the franchise would end in 2022 due to poor performance. It was also confirmed that an operator of last resort (OLR) controlled by the Scottish government would take over the franchise in April 2022. 

In March 2021, it was announced that the RMT union was to ballot conductors for an indefinite overtime ban following Abellio ScotRail refusing to pay its conductors overtime payments for working rest days, which led to no services on many routes. In April, ticket examiners were balloted for the same dispute, and most trains operated by ScotRail did not run on Sundays as a result. The dispute ended in October 2021, with a deal reached between the union and the operator.

Stations
Abellio ScotRail operated 352 stations in Scotland. Not included were Prestwick International Airport station, owned and operated by the airport, as well as both Edinburgh Waverley and Glasgow Central, which are managed by Network Rail. Abellio ScotRail operated Lockerbie even though none of its services called there. It also took over management of Dunbar, previously operated by Virgin Trains East Coast, in June 2015.

Depots
Abellio ScotRail's fleet was maintained at Edinburgh Haymarket, Glasgow Eastfield, Glasgow Shields Road, Corkerhill Glasgow, Yoker, Ayr Townhead, Bathgate and Inverness as well as a newly built EMU stabling depot at Millerhill in Midlothian and a rebuilt depot at Cadder Yard.

Rolling stock
Abellio ScotRail operated a diverse fleet of DMUs, EMUs and loco-hauled stock. From 10 December 2017, Class 380 EMUs were introduced onto services between Glasgow and Edinburgh via Falkirk High (also serving Croy, Polmont, Linlithgow and Haymarket). This was the first step in creating an entirely electric service between the two cities which was expected to start in October 2018 with Class 385 EMUs, which should have entered service in December 2017, but were subsequently delayed due to a windscreen fault.

Fleet at end of franchise

Abellio ScotRail was intending to introduce a brand new fleet of 46 three-car and 24 four-car Class 385 electric trains from December 2017, to operate services on the lines being electrified as part of the Edinburgh to Glasgow Improvement Programme. However, due to infrastructure problems, and issues with the trains involving software and windscreen issues, their introduction was delayed until September. To cover for the shortfall in rolling stock, Abellio ScotRail hired 10 Class 365 units from Great Northern. These entered service in June 2018.

From October 2018, Abellio ScotRail introduced former Great Western Railway HSTs on services between Edinburgh, Glasgow, Aberdeen and Inverness, branded as "Inter7City" in reference to Scotland's seven main cities. The Mark 3 coaches all have refurbished interiors and are fitted with powered doors. There will be 26 sets: 17 five-car and 9 four-car trains. As with the Class 385s there have been delays getting the refurbished trains into service. As a result, some HST sets were pressed into service without refurbishment to allow for others to have refurbishment completed. As of May 2020, ScotRail operates an entirely refurbished HST fleet.

This new rolling stock resulted in ten Class 156, eight Class 158 and 21 Class 170 sets returning to their leasing companies when their leases expired in 2018. Transport Scotland negotiated to retain an extra 13 Class 170s to support services through Fife to Aberdeen, the Fife Circle Line (replacing the Class 68/Mark 2 sets), and the Borders railway. Arriva Rail North received five of the 156s, all the 158s and 16 of the 170s. Five Class 170s (170416-170420) moved to East Midlands Railway in 2020.

Past fleet
This new rolling stock resulted in ten Class 156, eight Class 158 and 21 Class 170 sets returning to their leasing companies when their leases expired in 2018. Transport Scotland negotiated to retain an extra 13 Class 170s to support services through Fife to Aberdeen, the Fife Circle Line, and the Borders railway. Arriva Rail North received five of the 156s, all 8 of the 158s and 16 of the 170s. Five Class 170s (170416-170420) moved to East Midlands Railway in 2020.

Former train types operated by ScotRail include:

Notes

References

External links 

 

Nederlandse Spoorwegen
Railway companies established in 2015
Railway companies disestablished in 2022
Railway companies of Scotland
Train operating companies in the United Kingdom
2015 establishments in Scotland
2022 disestablishments in Scotland